Xi Scorpii (ξ Sco) is a quintuple star system in the constellation Scorpius. It was assigned this designation by Bayer, although Ptolemy had catalogued the star in Libra.  Flamsteed assigned it the designation 51 Librae, but this has fallen out of use since modern constellation boundaries assign the star to Scorpius.

Nomenclature
ξ Scorpii (Latinized to Xi Scorpii) is the star's Bayer designation. Xi Scorpii has no proper name, though it was erroneously known as Graffias before that name was applied to Beta Scorpii. Its Flamsteed designation is 51 Librae. When the modern constellation boundaries were drawn, Xi Scorpii was assigned to Scorpius, and the Flamsteed designation fell out of use.

The five stars of Xi Scorpii all have different designations. Depending on the catalogue, however, some designations apply to more than one stars. Xi Scorpii A, B, and C appear very close together in the sky and are often given one designation, while D and E are sometimes also given a single designation.  Struve's catalogue of multiple stars includes the pair AB and C as Σ1998 and the pair D and E as Σ1999.

Properties
The Xi Scorpii system consists of five stars in two groups separated by about 4.7 arcminutes (or 0.08°) on the sky.

The brighter group contains Xi Scorpii A, B, and C.  A and B are both yellow-white F-type stars. A is slightly brighter and warmer. They are separated by 0.744 arcseconds on average, and orbit around a common center once every 45.9 years. The dimmer, seventh-magnitude Xi Scorpii C orbits this pair at about ten times the distance, having a separation of around 7.6 arcseconds.

The second group contains Xi Scorpii D and E. Both D and E are K-type main-sequence stars, which are separated by about 11.9 arcseconds. They are known to be associated to each other and with the rest of the stars, because all stars share similar proper motions.

A sixth component, the 11th-magnitude Xi Scorpii F, is located 81 arcseconds from D, but is not known to be gravitationally bound to the other five components. Therefore, it is not considered to be part of the system.

References

External links

Scorpii, Xi
Scorpius (constellation)
6
5
F-type main-sequence stars
G-type main-sequence stars
K-type main-sequence stars
Librae, 51
Durchmusterung objects
9540 1
078727 38
5977 8
144069 70 87 88